Katharina is a genus of chitons in the family Mopaliidae.

Species
 Katharina tunicata Wood, 1815

References

Chiton genera
Monotypic mollusc genera
Mopaliidae
Taxa named by John Edward Gray